Shane Steven Harper (born February 14, 1993) is an American actor, singer, and songwriter. He is known for playing Spencer on Good Luck Charlie as well as Josh Wheaton in the independent Christian film God's Not Dead. His self-titled debut album was released on February 14, 2012.

Early life
Harper was born in La Jolla neighborhood of San Diego, the son of Tanya (née Michaelson) and Scott Harper. He is of Austrian, German, Jewish, and Scottish descent. He has an older sister named Samantha, also a professional dancer, and a younger brother named Sullivan, a model. Harper began dancing and acting at the age of nine, and was involved in community theater and competitive dance. He also started singing and playing guitar and piano at the same age. He is trained in ballet, hip-hop, lyrical, jazz, and tap. He also studied martial arts between the ages of four and 12, and obtained a black belt in Karate. In the spring of 2006, a talent agent on the judging panel of a regional dance competition offered Harper an agency representation.

Career

Acting career 
Harper had minor roles as a principal dancer in various shows and movies such as High School Musical 2, Re-Animated, and Dance Revolution before becoming one of the lead dancers and the youngest (the Nick 6) on Nickelodeon's Dance on Sunset. He landed on dance roles in 2006, including lead dancer for the music video Step Up with Samantha Jade, and Cartoon Network's Re-Animated and the Saturday morning kid's competition, Dance Revolution. In 2010, Harper got his first two movie roles in the films My Name is Khan and Flipped, as a minor character in each.

Harper also began his recurring role as Spencer Walsh on Disney Channel's Good Luck Charlie, playing alongside Bridgit Mendler, and guest-starred on an episode of Wizards of Waverly Place. He also guest-starred as the musical guest on So Random!, singing his single, "One Step Closer". He's also starred in 7 episodes in MTV's TV series Awkward as Austin Welch.

In March 2014, he starred in the Christian-based film, God's Not Dead, where he plays the main character, college student Josh Wheaton, who has to prove to his atheist professor that God is not dead while this professor is declaring that He is. For this movie, Harper finished writing his song called "Hold You Up", a song that encourages Christians to stand for their faith. The song peaked at number 1 on Billboards Hot AC/CHR charts, and has so far peaked at number 21 on the Billboard Hot Christian Charts.

He starred as Brandon in the musical film Dance-Off co-starring Kathryn McCormick. The movie is about two cross-town rival dance teams go head to head for the National Nationals Championship. Next, Harper starred as Ian Chandler in short lived MTV series Happyland co-starring alongside Bianca A. Santos and Katherine McNamara. In 2015, he starred as Stephen in the family film Lift Me Up.

He played the role of one of the disciples in the musical TV special The Passion, which was released March 20, 2016, on Fox. In 2017, Harper played the role of Robbie, a charming waiter at the resort who woos and then cheats on Baby's older sister, Lisa, in the TV movie Dirty Dancing for ABC. He played the role of Sam Grover in the indie film Flock of Four. He also guest starred in the CBS  dramas Code Black and Wisdom of the Crowd.

In 2018, Harper starred as Josh Wheaton in the third film in the franchise God's Not Dead: A Light in Darkness. He also starred as Tom Paxton in the PixL original movie The Time Capsule alongside Penelope Mitchell.

In 2020, Harper starred as Junior in the Starz series Hightown, and the Hulu miniseries, A Teacher as Logan Davis.

Music career 
Harper's first single, "Dance with Me", was released on March 30, 2010. The music video was released a couple of weeks prior and features Harper dancing and playing guitar. In 2011, Harper signed to AMi Records. In 2011, he released "One Step Closer", the second single from his debut album. The self-titled album was released on April 12, 2011. The third and final single released off of the album was "Rocketship". Also in 2011, Harper opened for Greyson Chance and Cody Simpson on their Waiting 4U Tour in addition to opening for Miranda Cosgrove on her Dancing Crazy Tour. The deluxe version of his debut album "Shane Harper" was released on February 14, 2012, at Target stores nationwide and features four bonus tracks. In 2012, Harper released Dancin in the Rain EP.

In 2016, Harper announced that he has signed a record deal with Capitol. April 29, 2016, Harper announced on his Twitter that he would support Jacob Whitesides on his The Lovesick Tour, which begun in May and ended in October. On May 27, 2016, Harper released  an EP titled "Like I Did." On August 11, 2016, he released a music video for "Like I Did".

Personal life
Harper was in a relationship with actress/singer and Good Luck Charlie co-star Bridgit Mendler in May 2011. However, at the beginning of November 2015, Mendler officially announced that they had ended their relationship.

Harper is a devout Christian.

Filmography

Discography

Studio albums

Extended plays

Singles

Promotional singles

Other charted songs

Other appearances
{| class="wikitable plainrowheaders" style="text-align:center;" border="1"
|+ List of guest appearances, with other performing artists, showing year released and album name 
! scope="col" style="width:16em;" | Title
! scope="col"| Year
! scope="col"| Other artist(s)
! scope="col"| Album
|-
! scope="row"| "What's Your Name"
| 2010
| Rob Reiner & Michael Bolten
| Flipped
|-
! scope="row"| "Love Can Move the Mountains"
| 2016
| Michael W. Smith, Jencarlos, Prince Royce, Chris Daughtry
| The Passion: New Orleans
|-
! scope="row"| "Turn the Lights Up"
| 2017
| 
| Lift Me Up|}

Music videos

Awards and nominations

Concert tours
Opening act
 Waiting 4U Tour  (2011)
 A Special Night with Demi Lovato  (2012)
 Dancing Crazy Tour  (2011)
 The Summer Kiss Tour  (2013)
 Summer Tour  (2013)
 The Lovesick Tour''  (2016)

References

External links

1993 births
21st-century American male actors
21st-century American singers
American Christians
American male child actors
American male film actors
American male singer-songwriters
American male television actors
American people of Austrian descent
American people of German descent
American people of Jewish descent
American people of Scottish descent
Living people
Male actors from Orange County, California
Male actors from San Diego
Musicians from San Diego
People from La Jolla, San Diego
Singer-songwriters from California
21st-century American male singers